 

TripleA is a free and open-source turn based strategy game based on the Axis & Allies board game.

Gameplay 
 features multiplayer and several AIs for single-player mode. For live multiplayer games, the community maintains two lobbies for the most current Stable and Unstable versions. There is also a Play by Email multiplayer mode.

World War II, Punic Wars and Napoleonic wars) with a variety of rules, units and many options, such as "low luck" which reduces the number of dice rolled making game depend more on strategy.

History 
 is developed in Java and can run on personal computers with Java SE installed. Originally set up on SourceForge repository in 2002, development was in 2016 migrated to GitHub. In February 2018 the game's GPLv2 license was re-licensed to the GPLv3.

Reception 
 has been compared to Axis & Allies and also Risk.

A cnet.com/download.com staff review rated it 4.5 of 5 and noted that . A Games4Mac review of the macOS version rated the game 70 of 100 in 2006. giga.de rated TripleA 3 of 5.

 was also used and mentioned in computer science related scientific publications due to its open source nature and project size and maturity.

The Polish game magazine CD-Action included  on a cover disk in 2012. As  is fully free and DFSG conforming in software and content, it is included in many Linux distributions, for instance Ubuntu OS, Gentoo, or Debian.

 became a popular freeware title which was offered by multiple download outlets, including digital distributor Desura. Alone from SourceForge.net the  client was downloaded between 2002 and 2016 over 1.2 million times. The game's maps are provided via a separate GitHub repository and are downloaded from there after a  client (from whatever source) is installed and started, indicating the existence of over 7 million  installations between 2010 and May 2017 (prior to the GitHub migration) from SourceForge alone.

See also
 Axis & Allies (1998 video game)
 List of open source games

References

External links
 
 
 

Open-source video games
Strategy video games
World War II grand strategy computer games
Freeware games
Linux games
Java platform games